(December 16, 1927 – July 25, 1984), born , was a Japanese film actor. While Hirata starred in many movies (including Hiroshi Inagaki's Samurai trilogy), he is most well known for his work in the kaiju genre, including such films as King Kong vs. Godzilla, The Mysterians, Terror of Mechagodzilla, Godzilla vs. Mechagodzilla, and his most famous role of Dr. Daisuke Serizawa, the brilliant but disturbed young scientist in the original Godzilla, released in 1954. Hirata was married to the popular actress Yoshiko Kuga from 1961 until his death. He died at age 56 in 1984 after a long battle with lung cancer.

Early life
Hirata was born in Seoul, Korea, in 1927, into a wealthy family. He was educated at the prestigious Tokyo University's School of Interior Design. Before joining Shintoho as an assistant director (under his older brother, Yoshiki Onoda), Hirata moved into still photography, and eventually joined Toho in 1953, under the studio's "New Face" program, which would lead to his casting in Godzilla (although Hirata was originally intended for the part of Ogata, eventually played by another genre regular, Akira Takarada).

Career
Hirata's film debut came in 1953, with The Last Embrace. Hirata would go on to play everything from snarling villains to government officials. His long face and intense features have earned the actor a cult following. Although Hirata earned lasting fame with his part in Godzilla, the role also typecast him, and the actor would go on to star in over 20 other sci-fi fantasy films for Toho (among them The H-Man, Gorath, and Prophecies of Nostradamus, as well as an important recurring role in the original Ultraman series.  In both his first and final appearances in a Godzilla film, Hirata played mysterious and disturbed scientists, as Hirata took on the role of the tragic Dr. Mafune in 1975's Terror of Mechagodzilla.

Death
Hirata died in 1984. The actor's association with the kaiju genre continued right until his death, as he helped announce the production of The Return of Godzilla at a Tokyo press conference, but unfortunately Hirata was too ill to appear in the film, and the part would eventually go to Yosuke Natsuki, who had appeared alongside Hirata in Ghidorah, the Three-Headed Monster in 1964. Hirata died on the 25th of July, 1984, after a long battle with lung cancer. His final film role was in the 1984 film Sayonara Jupiter.

Selected filmography

Film

 The Last Embrace (1953) as Yamaoka, alias Sandaime
 Pu-san (1953)
 Girls Amongst the Flowers (1953) as Takamaro Kitaôji
 Even the Mighty Shed Tears (1953)
 Farewell Rabaul (1954) as First lieutenant Noguchi
 Itsuko to sono haha (1954) as Kozo Miyoshi
 Samurai I: Musashi Miyamoto (1954) as Seijuro Yoshioka
 Godzilla (1954) as Dr. Daisuke Serizawa
 Sanjusan go sha otonashi (1955)
 Samurai II: Duel at Ichijoji Temple (1955) as Seijūrō Yoshioka
 The Lone Journey (1955) as Horikoshi no Masakichi
 Natsume Sôseki no Sanshirô (1955) as Sugimoto
 Kaettekita wakadan'na (1955) as Mochizuki
 Samurai III: Duel at Ganryu Island (1956) as Seijūrō Yoshioka
 Kuro-obi sangokushi (1956) as Shunsuke Iba
 Godzilla, King of the Monsters! (1956) as Dr. Serizawa
 Furyô shônen (1956)
 Harikiri shacho (1956)
 Ani to sono musume (1956) as Michio
 Nisshokû no natsu (1956)
 Rodan (1956) as Professor Kyouichiro Kashiwagi
 Taian kichijitsu (1957)
 Arashi no naka no otoko (1957)
 Ôban (1957)
 Nemuri Kyôshirô burai hikae dainibu (1957)
 Ninjitsu (1957) as Tomonori
 Wakare no chatsumi-uta (1957)
 Waga mune ni niji wa kiezu (1957) as Tokuoka
 Koto no tsume (1957)
 Zoku Ôban: Fûun hen (1957) as Count Arishima
 Saigo no dasso (1957) as Son
 Wakare no chatsumi-uta shimai-hen: Oneesan to yonda hito (1957)
 Kottaisan yori: Nyotai wa kanashiku (1957) as Sashichi
 Zokuzoku Ôban: Dotô hen (1957) as Arishima
 The Mysterians (1957) as Ryōichi Shiraishi
 Yagyû bugeichô: Sôryû hiken (1958) as Tomonori
 Kiuchi yasuto (1958)
 Kanai anzen (1958) as Yôtarô Ibuki
 The H-Man (1958) as Inspector Tominaga
 Hitokui ama (1958) as Detective Makino
 Hana no bojô (1958) as Seigetsu Izumida
 Josei SOS (1958)
 Varan the Unbelievable (1958) as Dr. Fujimura
 Ankokugai no kaoyaku (1959)
 Daigaku no oneechan (1959) as Iwafune
 Aru kengo no shogai (1959) as Akaboshi
 Submarine I-57 Will Not Surrender (1959)
 Sengoku gunto-den (1959) as Jiro Hidekuni
 The Three Treasures (1959) as Kibino Takehiko
 The Last Gunfight (1960) as Susumu Tendo, the killer
 Kuroi gashû: Aru sarariman no shôgen (1960)
 Sarariman shussetai kôki daigobu (1960)
 The Secret of the Telegian (1960) as Detective Kobayashi
 Dâisan hâtobanô kêtto (1960)
 Storm Over the Pacific (1960) as an Officer
 Daigaku no sanzôkutachi (1960) as Marukyû Department Store Manager
 Man Against Man (1960) as Torimi
 Dokuritsu gurentai nishi-e (1960)
 Minagoroshi no uta' yori kenjû-yo saraba! (1960) as Kozo Kinugawa
 The Story of Osaka Castle (1961) as Hayatonosho (Hayato) Susukida
 Ankokugai no dankon (1961)
 Nasake muyo no wana (1961) as Morishima
 Kaoyaku akatsukini shisu (1961)
 Ai to honoho to (1961) as Kyo Sawada
 Dangai no ketto Mothra (1961) as Doctor
 Kurenai no umi (1961)
 Onna bakari no yoru (1961)
 Kuroi gashû dainibu: Kanryû (1961)
 Sanjuro (1962) as Samurai
 Gorath (1962) as Spaceshop Otori [J-X Eagle] Captain Endo
 Dobunezumi sakusen (1962)
 King Kong vs. Godzilla (1962) as Doctor Shigesawa
 Yama-neko sakusen (1962)
 Wakai kisetsu (1962)
 Chūshingura: Hana no Maki, Yuki no Maki (1962) as Yasoemon Okajima
 Varan the Unbelievable (1962) as Observer
 Ankokugai no kiba (1962)
 Ai no uzu shio (1962)
 Attack Squadron! (1963) as Senda's Aide
 Onna ni tsuyoku naru kufû no kazukazu (1963) as Rokusuke Sakai
 Nippon jitsuwa jidai (1963)
 Chintao yôsai bakugeki meirei (1963)
 Hawai no wakadaishô (1963)
 Norainu sakusen (1963)
 Eburi manshi no yûga-na seikatsu (1963)
 Atragon (1963) as Mu Agent #23
 Whirlwind (1964) as Ryutaro Inoue
 Kyô mo ware ôzora ni ari (1964)
 Garakuta (1964)
 Ghidorah, the Three-Headed Monster (1964) as Chief Detective Okita
 Samurai Assassin (1965) as Sohei Masui
 Ankokugai gekitotsu sakusen (1965) as Shimada
 Fûrai ninpôchô (1965)
 Taiheiyô kiseki no sakusen: Kisuka (1965) as Dr. Kudo
 Honkon no shiroibara (1965) as Asano
 100 Shot, 100 Killed (1965) as Komori
 Baka to Hasami (1965)
 Musekinin Shimizu Minato (1965)
 Rise Against the Sword (1966) as Asakura
 Kiganjô no bôken (1966) as Chamberlain
 Ja ja umanarashi (1966)
 Doto ichiman kairi (1966) as Nozaki
 Ebirah, Horror of the Deep (1966) as Captain Yamoto
 The Killing Bottles (1967) as Man With Turkish Hat
 Japan's Longest Day (1967) as Commander Sugahara - 302nd Air Group
 Son of Godzilla (1967) as Fujisaki
 Ultraman (1968) as Professor Iwamoto
 Isoroku (1968) as Staff Officer Watanabe
 Dai bakuhatsu (1969) as W
 Latitude Zero (1969) as Dr. Sugata; Doctor of Latitude Zero
 Battle of the Japan Sea (1969) as Staff Officer Tsunoda
 Mito Kômon man'yûki (1969) as Geki Kurokawa
 Dai Nippon suri shûdan (1969) as Furansu
 Nagurikomi Shimizu Minato (1970)
 Kigeki: Makete tamaru ka! (1970)
 Gekido no showashi 'Gunbatsu (1970) as Tomita (uncredited)
 Kigeki kinô no teki wa kyô mo teki (1971)
 Ningen kakumei (1973)
 Karei-naru Ichizoku  (1974) (1974) as Haruta
 Godzilla vs. Mechagodzilla (1974) as Professor Hideto Miyajima
 Prophecies of Nostradamus (1974) as Environmental Scientist 1
 Terror of Mechagodzilla (1975) as Dr. Shinji Mafune
 Dômyaku rettô (1975) as Tanemura
 Ôzora no samurai (1976)
 Otoko wa tsurai yo: Torajirô to tonosama (1967) as Munemichi
 The War in Space (1977) as Commander Oishi, Japan Defence Forces
 Godzilla (1977) as Dr. Serizawa
 Ôgon no inu (1979) as Kan Aizawa
 Ah! Nomugi toge (1979) as Prince Fushiminomiya
 Ultraman: Great Monster Decisive Battle (1979)
 Port Arthur (1980) as Gaishi Nagaoka
 Imperial Navy (1981)
 Eki (1981)
 Chikagoro naze ka Charusuton (1981)
 Suparuta no umi (1983)
 Sayonara Jupiter (1984) as Doctor Inoue Ryutarou

Television
 Ultra Q (1966) as Chief Hanazawa
 Ultraman (1966-1967) as Dr. Iwamoto
 Ultraseven (1967) as Staff Officer Yanagawa
 Taiyō ni Hoero! (1972–83) as Takayuki Nishiyama(Semi-regular)
 Warrior of Love Rainbowman (1972) AS Mr. K
 Shinsho Taikōki (1973) as Hosokawa Fujitaka
 Onihei Hankachō (1975) as Kyōgoku Bizen
 Daitetsujin 17 (1977) as Captain Gomez
 Kusa Moeru (1979) as Yoshiyasu Ichijo

References

1927 births
1984 deaths
Deaths from lung cancer in Japan
Japanese male film actors
University of Tokyo alumni
20th-century Japanese male actors